Austin Richard Poganski (born February 16, 1996) is an American professional ice hockey forward who is currently playing for the Coachella Valley Firebirds in the American Hockey League (AHL) while under contract to the Seattle Kraken of the National Hockey League (NHL). He was selected by the St. Louis Blues, 110th overall, in the 2014 NHL Entry Draft.

Playing career
Poganski played junior hockey with the Tri-City Storm in the United States Hockey League (USHL) before committing to collegiate hockey with the University of North Dakota. Prior to his freshman season with the Fighting Sioux, Poganski was selected at the 2014 NHL Entry Draft in the fourth round, 110th overall, by the St. Louis Blues.

On March 26, 2018, having completed his collegiate career with the Fighting Sioux  following his senior season in 2017–18, Poganski signed a two-year, entry-level contract with the St. Louis Blues.

In the pandemic delayed and shortened  season, Poganski remained on the Blues roster primarily assigned to the club's extended taxi squad roster. Over the duration of the season, Poganski was limited to just 5 games, going scoreless.

As a free agent from the Blues, Poganski was signed to a one-year, two-way contract with the Winnipeg Jets on July 31, 2021.

At the conclusion of his contract with the Jets, Poganski was signed as a free agent with the Seattle Kraken after agreeing to a one-year, two-way contract on July 13, 2022.

Career statistics

Regular season and playoffs

International

References

External links

1996 births
Living people
American men's ice hockey right wingers
Coachella Valley Firebirds players
Manitoba Moose players
North Dakota Fighting Hawks men's ice hockey players
St. Louis Blues draft picks
St. Louis Blues players
San Antonio Rampage players
Tri-City Storm players
Tulsa Oilers (1992–present) players
Winnipeg Jets players